Ryu Ji-hyuk (born 13 January 1994) is a South Korean professional baseball infielder for the Kia Tigers of the KBO League. His major position is shortstop, however, he sometimes plays as second base man and third base man. His back number is No. 8.

On June 7, 2020, Hong Gun-hee of the Kia Tigers moved to the Kia Tigers in a one-on-one trade.

References

External links 
 Career statistics and player information from the KBO League
 Ryu ji-hyeok at Doosan Bears Baseball Club

1994 births
Living people
South Korean baseball players
Doosan Bears players
KBO League infielders
KBO League shortstops